The Agreement on the Conservation of Cetaceans of the Black Sea, Mediterranean Sea and contiguous Atlantic Area, or ACCOBAMS, is a regional international treaty that binds its States Parties on the conservation of Cetacea in their territories. The Agreement aims is to reduce threats to Cetaceans in the Mediterranean and Black Seas, as well as in the contiguous Atlantic area west of the Straits of Gibraltar.

Bodies of the agreement

Meeting of the Parties 
The Meeting of the Parties (MOP) is the main decision-making body of the Agreement. It meets triennially to review progress made towards the implementation of the Agreement, as well as any challenges this implantation faces. The MOP also adopts the budget for the Agreements and reviews scientific assessments on the conservation status of cetaceans of the Agreement area. Finally, at the MOP, member states also lay out the priorities for the next triennium.

Member states of the Agreement are automatically entitled to representation at the MOP and each have one vote. Additionally, organisations qualified in the conservation of cetaceans may also be represented by observers in the MOP.

Bureau 
The Bureau is the working body of the agreement and acts as the decision-making body for the agreement in-between the MOP, and carries out interim activities on it behalf. It also provides guidance to the Secretariat concerning the implementation and promotion of the Agreement.

The Bureau is composed of a Chair and Vice-Chairs, all elected by the MOP. Additionally, the Chair of the Scientific Committee is 
invited to participate as an observer. The Bureau meets at least once a year.

Secretariat 
The Secretariat is the executive body of the Agreement. It coordinates and organises the activities of the MOP, the Bureau and the Scientific Committee in order to ensure they can fully perform their assigned duties. Additionally, it monitors the budget, works to increase public awareness concerning the Agreement and its objectives, executes decisions addressed to it by the MOP and creates a report to present at each MOP on the work of all bodies of the Agreement.

Scientific Committee 
The Scientific Committee acts as an advisory body to the MOP. Its main duties include: 
 Providing advice to the MOP on scientific and technical matters
 Conducting scientific assessments of the conservation status of cetacean populations in the Agreement Area
 Advising on the development and co‐ordination of international research and monitoring programmes
 Preparing for each session of the MOP a report of its activities

The Scientific Committee is composed of "persons qualified as experts in cetacean conservation science" and meets
at the request of the MOP.

Agreement area 

According to Article 1 of the Agreement, the geographic scope of this Agreement is as follows: 
 All the maritime waters of the Black Sea and the Mediterranean, and their gulfs and seas
 The internal waters connected to, or interconnecting, these maritime waters
 The Atlantic area contiguous to the Mediterranean Sea west of the Straits of Gibraltar

In 2010, at MOP4, Portugal and Spain both submitted proposals to extend the Agreement area to cover parts of their respective exclusive economic zones. The proposal was adopted at the MOP, as Resolution A/4.1, and is currently in effect.

Species 
The Agreement covers 28 species of Cetacean that migrate throughout the range of the Agreement. 

Balaenidae
 North Atlantic Right Whale (Eubalaena glacialis)

Balaenopteridae
 Common Minke Whale (Balaenoptera acutorostrata)
 Sei whale (Balaenoptera borealis)
 Humpback Whale (Megaptera novaeangliae)
 Blue Whale (Balaenoptera musculus)
 Fin Whale (Balaenoptera physalus)

Delphinidae
 Bottlenose Dolphin (Tursiops truncatus)
 Risso's Dolphin (Grampus griseus)
 Killer Whale (Orcinus orca)
 Pygmy Killer Whale (Feresa attenuata)
 Long-Finned Pilot Whale (Globicephala melas)
 Rough-Toothed Dolphin (Steno bredanensis)
 Striped dolphin (Stenella coeruleoalba)
 Short-Finned Pilot Whale (Globicephala macrorhynchus)
 Common Dolphin (Delphinus delphis)
 False Killer Whale (Pseudorca crassidens)
 Black Sea Common Bottlenose Dolphin (Tursiops truncatus ponticus)

Kogiidae
 Pygmy Sperm Whale (Kogia breviceps)
 Dwarf Sperm Whale (Kogia sima)

Phocoenidae
 Harbour Porpoise (Phocoena phocoena)
 Black Sea Harbour Porpoise (Phocoena phocoena relicta)

Physeteridae
 Sperm Whale (Physeter macrocephalus)
 Dwarf Sperm Whale (Kogia simus)

Ziphiidae
 Blainville's Beaked Whale (Mesoplodon densirostris)
 Sowerby's Beaked Whale (Mesoplodon bidens)
 Gervais' Beaked Whale (Mesoplodon europaeus)
 True's Beaked Whale (Mesoplodon mirus)
 Cuvier's Beaked Whale (Ziphius cavirostris)

Member States

States Parties 
The following are all the States Parties to the Agreement, as well as the date the Agreement entered into force in waters under their jurisdiction:

Range States 
The following are the Range States that have not ratified or acceded to the Agreement:
Signed, but not ratified:
 
 
Other Range States:

See also 
List of environmental agreements
ASCOBANS
Convention on Migratory Species (CMS)
Marine Protected Area

References

External links 

ACCOBAMS website

Environmental treaties
Cetacean research and conservation
Treaties concluded in 1996
Treaties entered into force in 2001
2001 in the environment
Treaties of Albania
Treaties of Algeria
Treaties of Bulgaria
Treaties of Croatia
Treaties of Cyprus
Treaties of Egypt
Treaties of France
Treaties of Georgia (country)
Treaties of Greece
Treaties of Italy
Treaties of Lebanon
Treaties of the Libyan Arab Jamahiriya
Treaties of Malta
Treaties of Montenegro
Treaties of Monaco
Treaties of Morocco
Treaties of Portugal
Treaties of Romania
Treaties of Slovenia
Treaties of Spain
Treaties of Syria
Treaties of Tunisia
Treaties of Ukraine